1976 presidential election may refer to:

 1976 Algerian presidential election
 1976 Icelandic presidential election
 1976 Irish presidential election
 1976 Portuguese presidential election
 1976 United States presidential election